The Southern Lights most often refers to the Aurora australis

(The) Southern Lights may also refer to:

 Southern Lights (novel), by Danielle Steel, 2009
 Southern Lights (album), by SJD, 2004
 Southern Lights: Overexposed, a 2015 multimedia album by Alex Faith and Dre Murray
 "The Southern Lights", an episode of animated TV series The Legend of Korra

See also
 Northern Lights (disambiguation)
 Southern Light Opera Company, a Scottish operatic society
 Southern Lights Suplex, a  wrestling move, a variation of the saito suplex, used by Drew Gulak